Cyclothone kobayashii, commonly known as the Kobayashi's bristlemouth, is a species of ray-finned fish in the genus Cyclothone. It is found in the Southern Ocean.

References

Gonostomatidae
Fish described in 1994